Fernando Suárez González (born 10 August 1933) is a Spanish politician and jurist. As of 2021, he is the last living minister who served in Francisco Franco's regime.

Biography
Suárez graduated in law from the University of Oviedo, then completed his PhD at the University of Bologna. He worked, among others as an academic teacher at the Complutense University of Madrid, where he became professor of labor law. In 1969, he returned to Oviedo as chairman, and two years later as dean. He was also active in the state administration during the Francoist period. In 1973 he became the general director of the Instituto Español de Emigración, an institution dealing with migration policy. In 1975, in the last government headed by General Francisco Franco, Suárez served as Minister of Labour and Third Deputy Prime Minister.

After the political changes, Suárez was active in the People's Alliance and then the People's Party. In the years 1982–1986, he was a member of the Congress of Deputies of the second term. After the accession of Spain to the European Economic Community in 1986, he assumed the mandate of a member of the European Parliament for the second term. He kept it in the 1987 and 1989 general elections. He served as vice-chairman of the Budget Committee, vice-chairman of the Group for European Democracy and a member of the presidium of the European People's Party.

Suárez continued his academic activity at UNED. In 2007, he received a membership in the Real Academia de Ciencias Morales y Políticas.

In 2014, the Argentine judge María Romilda Servini issued an arrest and extradition order against several former ministers of the Franco dictatorship. Suárez was included in the order for his responsibility for the death penalty of the last five executions by the Franco dictatorship in 1975. The request for extradition was refused by the Spanish High Court on the basis that the statute of limitations had run out on the accusation against him.

References

1936 births
Living people
People from León, Spain
Government ministers during the Francoist dictatorship
FET y de las JONS politicians
People's Alliance (Spain) politicians
People's Party (Spain) politicians
Deputy Prime Ministers of Spain
Members of the 2nd Congress of Deputies (Spain)
MEPs for Spain 1986–1987
MEPs for Spain 1987–1989
MEPs for Spain 1989–1994
University of Oviedo alumni
Academic staff of the Complutense University of Madrid
Spanish jurists